Ramal de Mora is a closed railway branch in Portugal, which connected the stations of Évora, on the Linha de Évora, and Mora. It was opened in 1908, and closed in 1990.

See also 
 List of railway lines in Portugal
 List of Portuguese locomotives and railcars
 History of rail transport in Portugal

References

Sources
 

Railway lines in Portugal
Railway lines opened in 1908
Railway lines closed in 1990
Iberian gauge railways